Wild Beauty is a 1927 American silent Western film directed by Henry MacRae and starring Hugh Allan, June Marlowe and Scott Seaton.

Cast
 Rex as Thunderhoof
 Hugh Allan as Bill Moran 
 June Marlowe as Helen Cunningham
 Scott Seaton as Colonel Cunningham
 Hayes E. Robertson as Washington - stableman
 William Bailey as Jim Kennedy
 Jack Pratt as Davis

References

Bibliography
 Pitts, Michael R. Western Movies: A Guide to 5,105 Feature Films. McFarland, 2012.

External links
 

1927 films
1927 Western (genre) films
1920s English-language films
American black-and-white films
Universal Pictures films
Films directed by Henry MacRae
Silent American Western (genre) films
1920s American films